Pickerel Lake is a lake in the U.S. state of Minnesota. It is an Oxbow lake of the Mississippi River in Lilydale, Minnesota. The Omaha Road Bridge Number 15 crosses the Northeastern end.

Pickerel Lake was named for the pickerel fish, commonly known as the Northern pike, native to its waters.

See also
List of lakes in Minnesota

References

Lakes of Minnesota
Lakes of Dakota County, Minnesota
Lakes of Ramsey County, Minnesota